The Hegel House is a museum in Stuttgart, Germany, located in the house where the philosopher Georg Wilhelm Friedrich Hegel was born.

Born in 1770, Hegel lived in Stuttgart for the first 18 years of his life; he died in Berlin in 1831.  The Hegel House is on Eberhardstraße, and dates from the 16th century.

The ground floor contains an exhibition about Stuttgart during Hegel's lifetime.  Another exhibition is devoted to Hegel's life story, and includes his famous beret and his Stammbuch (an early form of friendship book).  A third room contains a text collage of key quotations from Hegel, and various editions of his works in different languages.

External links
 Home page on the city of Stuttgart's website 

Museums in Stuttgart
Georg Wilhelm Friedrich Hegel
Biographical museums in Germany